Robert Felton (died 1438) was a Canon of Windsor from 1428 to 1432.

Career

He was appointed:
Prebendary of St Stephen's Westminster 1423 - 1438
Rector of St Vedast Foster Lane 1425 - 1438
Prebendary of Bracklesham in Chichester 1432
Almoner to Henry VI 1432 
Prebendary of Cadington Major in St Paul's 1433 - 1438 
 
He was appointed to the eleventh stall in St George's Chapel, Windsor Castle in 1428 and held the canonry until 1432.

Notes 

1438 deaths
Canons of Windsor
Year of birth unknown